Prokineticin is a secreted protein that potently contracts gastrointestinal smooth muscle.

Recently, prokineticins have been recognized in humans and other vertebrates. They are thought to be involved in several important physiological processes like neurogenesis, tissue development, angiogenesis, and nociception. Other important physiological roles the Bv8/Prokineticins (PKs) are involved in may include cancer, reproduction, and regulating physiological functions that influence circadian rhythms like hormone secretion, ingestive behaviors, and the sleep/wake cycle.

Mutations in the PROK2 (also known as KAL4) gene have been implicated in hypogonadotropic hypogonadism and gynecomastia.

See also
 Prokineticin receptor

References

External links
 
 

Intestinal hormones